The number of women sitting in the House of Commons decreased to four during the 27th Canadian Parliament; the number of women senators returned to six. 37 women ran for seats in the Canadian House of Commons in the 1965 federal election; three women out of six incumbents were reelected. Pauline Jewett and Margaret Konantz were defeated when they ran for reelection; Eloise Jones did not run for reelection. Grace MacInnis was also elected to the House of Commons in the general election, becoming the first woman elected to the House of Commons from British Columbia.

Mary Elizabeth Kinnear was named to the Canadian senate in April 1967, bringing the number of women senators to six. Marianna Beauchamp Jodoin resigned her seat in June 1966, decreasing the number of women in the Senate to five.

Party Standings

Members of the House of Commons

Senators

References 

Lists of women politicians in Canada